Footrot Flats: The Dog's Tail Tale is the soundtrack to the New Zealand animated film, Footrot Flats: The Dog's Tale. In February 1987, the album spent two weeks in the top five of the New Zealand albums chart.

Background
Tim Finn was originally offered the chance to orchestrate the soundtrack. When he turned it down Dobbyn accepted the role.

Track listing

The 2006 20th anniversary release featured one bonus track.

Charts

Awards
The soundtrack won a number of awards at the RIANZ New Zealand Music Awards. Both of the Footrot Flat singles were awarded Best Song of the Year at the New Zealand Music Awards (in 1986 and 1987 respectively). Dobbyn also won Best Male Vocalist in 1987 for his work on 'You Oughta Be in Love'.

References

Compilation albums by New Zealand artists
1986 soundtrack albums
1986 compilation albums
APRA Award winners
Pop soundtracks
Pop compilation albums
Dave Dobbyn albums
Sony Music New Zealand compilation albums